Paul L. McPherson (born July 3, 1978) is an American former professional basketball player.

A 6'4" (1.93 m) shooting guard from Chicago's South Shore High School, McPherson played at Tallahassee Community College, Kennedy-King College, and DePaul University before being signed by the Phoenix Suns of the National Basketball Association. McPherson played a total of 55 games in his NBA career, all during the 2000–01 NBA season, playing 33 games with the Suns and 22 with the Golden State Warriors. His career averages are 4.8 points per game and 1.4 rebounds per game. His final NBA game was played on April 18, 2001 in a 81 - 95 loss to the Vancouver Grizzlies where he played 10 and half minutes and the only stat he recorded was 1 rebound.

After his brief stint in the NBA, McPherson played in the American minor leagues and overseas. He also spent part of the 2002-2003 basketball season touring with the Harlem Globetrotters.

Furthermore. he reached the Semifinal of the Nike King of the World Battleground 2004 and won $10000, but could not get to the final.

References

1978 births
Living people
21st-century African-American sportspeople
African-American basketball players
American expatriate basketball people in Argentina
American expatriate basketball people in France
American expatriate basketball people in Georgia (country)
American expatriate basketball people in Italy
American men's basketball players
Basketball players from Chicago
Basket Livorno players
BC Rustavi players
Big3 players
DePaul Blue Demons men's basketball players
Golden State Warriors players
Harlem Globetrotters players
HTV Basket players
Idaho Stampede (CBA) players
KK Zadar players
Pallacanestro Reggiana players
Phoenix Suns players
Point guards
Rockford Lightning players
Tallahassee Eagles men's basketball players
Undrafted National Basketball Association players
Yakima Sun Kings players
20th-century African-American sportspeople
American men's 3x3 basketball players